USCGC Heriberto Hernandez is the 14th  cutter delivered to the United States Coast Guard. Like five of her sister ships, her initial assignment will see her based in San Juan, Puerto Rico.

The Coast Guard decided to design all its new cutters, even its smallest, to be able to accommodate mixed sex crews.  The Sentinels, and the smaller s, have berthing areas of various sizes, to make this possible.  A Sentinel's complement is 22, and they are armed with a 25 mm Bushmaster autocannon, that can operated remotely, and four crew-served fifty caliber Browning machine guns. The cutters are equipped with a sophisticated modern sensor suite, that can share data with other vessels. The Sentinel class is equipped with a stern launching ramp, that can deploy and retrieve the vessel's 7-meter high-speed jet-boat, even when the vessels are underway. Only a single crewmember is required to remain on deck to deploy or retrieve the jet-boat.

Heriberto Hernandez was commissioned in her home port, San Juan, Puerto Rico, on October 16, 2015.

Operational career

In January, 2019, the Heriberto Hernandez apprehended a small vessel with 35 people aboard they determined were intending to illegally enter the United States.  Near the vessel they also found a floating backpack containing $3.6 million worth of heroin.  27 of the vessel's occupants were turned over to the Dominican Republic, while the remaining 8 were turned over to the US Justice Department.

On January 5, 2021, while patrolling the Mona Passage, the Heriberto Hernandez sighted a suspicious vessel.  The unregistered vessel, which seemed to be home-built, which had three men aboard, was found north of Desecheo Island.  The crew of the Heriberto Hernandez deemed it unseaworthy, and took the men aboard.  Biometric scans determined one of the men had an arrest warrant for a double murder in San Juan.  The cutter rendezvoused with a vessel from the Dominican Navy, to pass over the other two men, who claimed to be Dominican citizens, and then handed over custody of the suspect to officials of the US Marshall Service in Mayaguez, Puerto Rico.

Namesake

Like all of the cutters of her class she is named after someone who served in the Coast Guard, or one of its three precursor services, the United States Revenue Cutter Service, the United States Lighthouse Service or the United States Lifeboat Service, who was recognized for their heroism.

Point Cypress was patrolling a river in South Vietnam, during the Vietnam War, when he died. He received a posthumous Bronze Star for valor.

References

External links
 

Sentinel-class cutters
Ships of the United States Coast Guard
2015 ships
Ships built in Lockport, Louisiana